Frog and Toad is a series of easy-reader children's books, written and illustrated by Arnold Lobel. 

Each book contains five simple, often humorous, sometimes poignant, short stories chronicling the exploits of an anthropomorphic frog and toad, named Frog and Toad respectively. The situations in which they find themselves are a cross between the human and animal worlds. Some of their adventures include attempting to fly a kite, cleaning Toad's dirty house, and finding out different reasons for isolation.  

Frog is taller with a green shade, and is more cheery and relaxed than Toad; Toad is shorter and stout with a brown shade, and while just as caring and friendly as Frog, is also the more serious and uptight of the duo.

Origins
When Lobel was sick and out of school for much of second grade, he kept himself busy by drawing. He used his animal drawings as a way of coping with the social insecurity of his return and to make friends. His books about animal friends, such as Frog and Toad, were drawn from these experiences. Lobel himself wrote, "Frog and Toad are really two aspects of myself." In The New Yorker, his daughter Adrianne Lobel suggested "that there’s another dimension to the series’s sustained popularity. Frog and Toad are 'of the same sex, and they love each other'," and that the series "really was the beginning of him coming out".<ref name="NewYorker">{{cite web|last1=Stokes|first1=Colin|title=Frog and Toad': An Amphibious Celebration of Same-Sex Love.|url=https://www.newyorker.com/books/page-turner/frog-and-toad-an-amphibious-celebration-of-same-sex-love|website=New Yorker|publisher=New Yorker|access-date=14 March 2018|date=31 May 2016}}</ref>

BooksFrog and Toad Are Friends (1970), Frog and Toad Together (1972), Frog and Toad All Year (1976), Days with Frog and Toad (1979), 

Omnibus editionsThe Frog and Toad Treasury (1996), includes Frog and Toad are Friends, Frog and Toad Together, and Frog and Toad All YearAdventures of Frog and Toad (2005), includes Frog and Toad are Friends, Frog and Toad Together, and Days with Frog and Toad
 Frog and Toad Storybook Treasury (2013), includes all four original books

 Later releases 
In 2008, three of Arnold Lobel's uncolored, unpublished Frog and Toad books were discovered in an estate sale. They were consolidated into two books and colored by Lobel's daughter Adrianne Lobel. They are written, illustrated, and delivered in a manner different from the original four books.The Frogs and Toads All Sang (2009), color by Adrianne Lobel, Odd Owls and Stout Pigs: A Book of Nonsense (2009), color by Adrianne Lobel, 

ReceptionFrog and Toad is valued by experts in children's literature for its portrayal of the value of friendship.Frog and Toad are Friends was a Caldecott Honor Book, or runner-up for the annual American Library Association (ALA) Caldecott Medal, which recognizes children's picture book illustration. In 2012, it was ranked number 15 among the "Top 100 Picture Books" in a survey published by School Library Journal.Frog and Toad Together was a Newbery Honor Book, which recognizes children's literature.Frog and Toad All Year won a Christopher Award in 1977 – one of five, at a time when books for young people was the only award category. The awards recognize "media that 'affirm the highest values of the human spirit'  ... Award winners encourage audiences to see the better side of human nature and motivate artists and the general public to use their best instincts on behalf of others."

Adaptations
In the 1980s, Churchill Films produced 18-minute and 30-minute adaptations of the first two books using clay animation. Both films were directed by John Clark Matthews, credited also as theme music composer and one principal animator. Frog and Toad were voiced by Will Ryan and Hal Smith respectively."Frog and Toad Together (1987)". IMDb. Retrieved 2015-09-19. They were narrated by Lobel. Frog and Toad Are Friends was released on May 23, 1985; Frog and Toad Together on September 3, 1987. They were distributed to the home market only (direct-to-video).

The Frog and Toad books inspired a Broadway musical, A Year with Frog and Toad. The musical was commissioned by Lobel's daughter, Adrianne Lobel, played off-Broadway, and ran briefly on Broadway in 2003. It was nominated for three Tony Awards. Prior to this, the books had inspired a non-musical play, "Frog and Toad (Forever)" written by Y York, and performed at Seattle Children's Theatre in 1998 and First Stage Milwaukee in 1999.

An animated series based on the books is set to premiere on Apple TV+ on April 28, 2023. It stars Nat Faxon as Frog and Kevin Michael Richardson as Toad. It also features Ron Funches, Fortune Feimster, Yvette Nicole Brown, Margaret Cho, Cole Escola, Tom Kenny and Aparna Nancherla.

References

External links
 Review of the series in The Bulletin of the Center for Children's Books 
 "Chance Find Leads to New Lobel Picture Books", Sue Corbett, Publishers Weekly'', May 28, 2009
 YouTube video from HarperCollins – Adrianne Lobel describes how her father's handmade books were discovered and how she colored them

1985 films
1985 animated films
1980s stop-motion animated films
Clay animation films
Children's fiction books
Series of children's books
Literary duos
Animated duos
Books about frogs
Children's books about friendship
Animated films about frogs
Animated films about friendship
Picture books by Arnold Lobel
Literary characters introduced in 1970
Film characters introduced in 1985
Anthropomorphic amphibians
Fictional frogs